Äntligen Hemma was a Swedish interior design magazine founded in 1999 by LRF Media. It was merged with another magazine, Din trädgård, in 2004 to create the present-day design magazine Drömhem och Trädgård.

In 2013, the magazine was sold to Aller Media.

References

1999 establishments in Sweden
2004 disestablishments in Sweden
Defunct magazines published in Sweden
Design magazines
Magazines established in 1999
Magazines disestablished in 2004
Swedish-language magazines